Brassica is a genus of plants in the cabbage and mustard family (Brassicaceae). The members of the genus are informally known as cruciferous vegetables, cabbages, or mustard plants. Crops from this genus are sometimes called cole cropsderived from the Latin caulis, denoting the stem or stalk of a plant.

The genus Brassica is known for its important agricultural and horticultural crops and also includes a number of weeds, both of wild taxa and escapees from cultivation. Brassica species and varieties commonly used for food include bok choy, broccoli, cauliflower, cabbage, choy sum, kohlrabi, napa cabbage, rutabaga, turnip and some seeds used in the production of canola oil and the condiment mustard. Over 30 wild species and hybrids are in cultivation, plus numerous cultivars and hybrids of cultivated origin. Most are seasonal plants (annuals or biennials), but some are small shrubs. Brassica plants have been the subject of much scientific interest for their agricultural importance. Six particular species (B. carinata, B. juncea, B. oleracea, B. napus, B. nigra, and B. rapa) evolved by the combining of chromosomes from three earlier species, as described by the triangle of U theory.

The genus is native to Western Europe, the Mediterranean and temperate regions of Asia. Many wild species grow as weeds, especially in North America, South America, and Australia.

A dislike for cabbage or broccoli can result from the fact that these plants contain a compound similar to phenylthiocarbamide (PTC), which is either bitter or tasteless to people depending on their taste buds.

Uses

Food 
The flowers, seeds, stalks, and tender leaves of many species of Brassica can be eaten raw or cooked. Almost all parts of some species have been developed for food, including the root (swede, turnip), stems (kohlrabi), leaves (cabbage, collard greens, kale), flowers (cauliflower, broccoli, romanesco broccoli), buds (Brussels sprouts, cabbage), and seeds (many, including mustard seed, and oil-producing rapeseed). Some forms with white or purple foliage or flowerheads are also sometimes grown for ornament.

Brassica species are sometimes used as food plants by the larvae of a number of Lepidoptera species—see List of Lepidoptera that feed on Brassica.

Cooking 
Boiling substantially reduces the levels of broccoli glucosinolates, while other cooking methods, such as steaming, microwaving, and stir frying, have no significant effect on glucosinolate levels.

Species 
There is some disagreement among botanists on the classification and status of Brassica species and subspecies. The following is an abbreviated list, with an emphasis on economically important species.

 Brassica balearica: Mallorca cabbage
 Brassica carinata: Abyssinian mustard or Abyssinian cabbage, used to produce biodiesel
 Brassica elongata: elongated mustard
 Brassica fruticulosa: Mediterranean cabbage
 Brassica hilarionis: St. Hilarion cabbage
 Brassica juncea: Indian mustard, brown and leaf mustards, Sarepta mustard
 Brassica napus: rapeseed, rutabaga, Siberian kale
 Brassica narinosa: broadbeaked mustard
 Brassica nigra: black mustard
 Brassica oleracea: kale, cabbage, collard greens, broccoli, cauliflower, kai-lan, Brussels sprouts, kohlrabi
 Brassica perviridis: tender green, mustard spinach
 Brassica rapa (syn. B. campestris): Chinese cabbage, turnip, rapini, komatsuna
 Brassica rupestris Raf.
 Brassica spinescens:
 Brassica tournefortii: Asian mustard

Species formerly placed in Brassica 
 B. alba or B. hirta (white or yellow mustard)—see Sinapis alba
 B. geniculata (hoary mustard)—see Hirschfeldia incana
 B. kaber (wild mustard or charlock)—see Sinapis arvensis

Genome sequencing and genetics 
Bayer CropScience (in collaboration with BGI-Shenzhen, China; KeyGene; the Netherlands and the University of Queensland, Australia) announced it had sequenced the entire genome of rapeseed (canola, Brassica napus) and its constituent genomes present in B. rapa and B. oleracea in 2009. The B. rapa genome was sequenced by the Multinational Brassica Genome Project in 2011. This also represents the A genome component of the amphidiploid crop species B. napus and B. juncea.

Etymology 
'Brassica' was Pliny the Elder's name for several cabbage-like plants.

References

External links

 
Brassicaceae genera
Taxa named by Carl Linnaeus